Eduardo C. Corral is an American poet and MFA Assistant Professor in the Department of English at NC State University. His first collection, Slow Lightning, published by Yale University Press, was the winner of the 2011 Yale Younger Series Poets award, making him the first Latino recipient of this prize. His 2020 work, guillotine, was awarded the 2021 Lambda Literary Award for gay poetry and was longlisted for the 2020 National Book Award for Poetry.

Personal life
Corral was born in Casa Grande, Arizona to Higinio and Socorro Corral, on February 25, 1973.

He teaches at North Carolina State University.

He wrote a poem in his high school AP English class that was based on the poem "Beowulf". Despite being a fabulous student he decided to not take this assignment seriously. Even though he didn't take it seriously, his teacher loved his poem and kept it on her corkboard for others to see.

Career
Corral studied Chicano studies at Arizona State University. He received his Masters in Fine Arts from the Iowa Writer's Workshop. Corral was also a founding fellow of the CantoMundo Writers Conference. He is a featured faculty member at the 2018 Poetry Seminar at The Frost Place in Franconia, NH.

His poems have been published in various journals including Black Warrior Review, Beloit Poetry Journal, Colorado Review, Indiana Review, Meridian, MiPOesias, and The Nation.

His collection "Slow Lightning" was chosen by Carl Phillips for the prestigious Yale Younger Series Poets award.  Corral is the first Latino poet chosen for the prize.  He has cited Robert Hayden, Federico García Lorca, C.D. Wright, and José Montoya as influences.

Slow Lighting (Yale University Press, 2012) 
Corral is intentional and careful when writing. He's filled several notebooks, which he has saved, when writing his first collection.

Awards/Fellowships
Discovery/The Nation Award, 2005
New Millennium Writings Award
Whiting Award, 2011
Yale Younger Series Poets, 2011
Yaddo Fellowship
MacDowell Colony Fellowship
Olive B. O'Connor Fellowship, 2009
Lambda Literary Award for Gay Poetry, 2021

Publications
Poetry Collections
 Slow Lightning, Yale University Press, 2012. , 
 Guillotine, Graywolf Press,  2020.

See also

List of Mexican American writers
List of CantoMundo Former Fellows

References

Sources
 "Poetry opened doors wide for Eduardo Corral" by Richard Ruelas, Arizona Republic, November 26, 2011.

External links
 Profile of Corral on the Arizona Republic website
 Three Poems by Corral at Poetry Foundation website
 Profile of Corral on the Whiting Foundation website
 Corral page on Yale University Press website
 Interview on Ploughshares website
Eduardo Corral recorded at the Library of Congress for the Hispanic Division’s audio literary archive on September 17, 2012

1973 births
American male poets
American poets of Mexican descent
Arizona State University alumni
American gay writers
Hispanic and Latino American poets
Iowa Writers' Workshop alumni
LGBT Hispanic and Latino American people
American LGBT poets
Living people
People from Casa Grande, Arizona
Poets from Arizona
University of Iowa alumni
Yale Younger Poets winners
21st-century American poets
People from Rego Park, Queens
21st-century American male writers
Lambda Literary Award for Gay Poetry winners
Gay poets